Septentrion may refer to:

 Septentrional, a Latinate word once used in English and French to refer to northern regions
 Septentrionalist, referring to the Viking revival of the 18th and 19th centuries
 Operation Septentrion, a 2009 ISAF military operation in Afghanistan
 Septentrional-Oriente fault zone, a geological fault in the Caribbean

Arts and entertainment
 Septentrion (album), by Anodajay, 2006
 Septentrión, an album by Anima Mundi, 2002
 Septentrion (video game), or SOS, a 1993 video game
 Septentrion, a 2009 book by Jean Raspail
 Septentriones, fictional creatures in the video game Shin Megami Tensei: Devil Survivor 2

See also
 Septentrioniidae, an extinct family of jawless fish
 Septentrionia, a genus in the family Septentrioniidae